Lilian Snelling (1879–1972) was "probably the most important British botanical artist of the first half of the 20th century".
She was the principal artist and lithographer to Curtis's Botanical Magazine between 1921 and 1952 and "was considered one of the greatest botanical artists of her time" – "her paintings were both detailed and accurate and immensely beautiful".
She was appointed MBE in 1954 and was awarded the Victoria Medal in 1955.

Biography 

Lilian Snelling was born on 8 June 1879 at Spring Hall, St Mary Cray, Kent into the large family of John Carnell Snelling (1841–1902), brewer, and his wife, Margaret Elizabeth, née Colgalt. She and her sisters were boarders at a school in Tunbridge Wells.
In 1915–16 Henry John Elwes commissioned her to paint flowers (which he had gathered on his travels), at his home Colesbourne Park in Gloucestershire.

Snelling worked at the Royal Botanic Garden Edinburgh from 1916 to 1921 painting plant portraits for Sir Isaac Bayley Balfour, Keeper of the Botanic Garden and Professor of Botany at the University of Edinburgh. She studied lithography under Frank Morley Fletcher.

She left in 1921 to work at the Royal Botanic Gardens, Kew as principal artist and lithographer to Curtis's Botanical Magazine which had recently been bought by the RHS where from 1929 she was assisted by Stella Ross-Craig. After 30 years she retired in 1952 having produced over 830 paintings and plates. Volume 169 of Curtis's was dedicated to her: "artist, lithographer and botanical illustrator who with remarkable delicacy of accurate outlines, brilliancy of colour and intricate gradation of tone, has faithfully portrayed most of the plants figured in this magazine from 1922 to 1952."

Her paintings illustrated the supplement to Grove's supplement to Henry John Elwes's Monograph of the Genus Lilium (1934), Stern's, Study of the genus Paeonia (1946) and Fred Stoker's A Book of Lilies (1943.)

In 1954 she was appointed MBE in the Birthday Honours List.
In 1955 she was awarded the Victoria Medal, the RHS's highest honour.

In 1959 her work was featured in the Kew Gardens's bicentennial exhibition: "Kew's Aid to Botany over 200 Years" where she was described as "one of a remarkable group of women" who included Stella Ross-Craig, Ann V. Webster and Margaret Stones.
She died at her home, 208 High Street, St Mary Cray, Kent, on 12 October 1972.

In 2007 the Royal Botanic Garden Edinburgh held a ten-week-long exhibition dedicated to her work.

Works 
  OCLC 3663850
  OCLC 14200835
  OCLC 4017629
 OCLC 5163877

References

Further reading

 OCLC 1497658

External links 
 The official website for RHS Lindley Library. The library holds over 600 of Snelling's original works.
 . Kew Library and Archive which holds original work by Snelling
 

1879 births
1972 deaths
20th-century English painters
20th-century English women artists
Botanical illustrators
English women painters
Members of the Order of the British Empire
Victoria Medal of Honour recipients